The 1987 IAAF World Race Walking Cup was held on 2 and 3 May 1987 in the streets of New York City, USA.  The event was also known as IAAF Race Walking World Cup.

Complete results were published.

Medallists

Results

Men's 20 km

Men's 50 km

Team (men)
The team rankings, named Lugano Trophy, combined the 20 km and 50 km events team results.

Women's 10 km

Team (women)

Participation
The participation of 326 athletes (236 men/90 women) from 36 countries is reported.

 (7/-)
 (6/3)
 (8/3)
 (7/4)
 (8/5)
 (8/5)
 (7/3)
 (4/-)
 (8/-)
 (-/2)
 (4/-)
 (8/-)
 (3/-)
 (3/3)
 (8/3)
 (10/5)
 (3/-)
 (8/4)
 (4/2)
 (9/5)
 (3/-)
 (2/-)
 (8/4)
 (3/-)
 (4/5)
 (8/-)
 (7/-)
 (5/-)
 (8/4)
 (10/5)
 (10/5)
 (8/3)
 (8/4)
 (10/5)
 (10/3)
 (8/4)

See also
 1987 Race Walking Year Ranking

References

External links
IAAF World Race Walking Cup 1961-2006 Facts & Figures - IAAF.org

World Athletics Race Walking Team Championships
World Race Walking Cup
World Race Walking Cup
International track and field competitions hosted by the United States